Eburodacrys separata is a species of beetle in the family Cerambycidae. It was described by Martins, Galileo and Oliveira in 2011.

References

Eburodacrys
Beetles described in 2011